Yamaha developed a number of naturally-aspirated racing engines during their time in Formula One; between  and . They initially supplied engines for the Zakspeed team, in 1991 for the Brabham BT60Y, in 1992 for the Jordan 192, from 1993 to 1996 for Tyrrell, and in 1997 for the Arrows A18. These never won a race (Damon Hill nearly did so at the 1997 Hungarian Grand Prix), but drivers including Damon Hill, Ukyo Katayama, Mark Blundell and Mika Salo scored some acceptable results with them. However, their engines were often unreliable and were usually regarded as not very powerful.

References

Yamaha products
Formula One engines
Engines by model
Gasoline engines by model
V8 engines
V10 engines
V12 engines